The Royal Australian Navy Band (RAN Band) is the Royal Australian Navy's official musical branch. The band comprises two full-time detachments and four part-time detachments positioned across Australia, and is one of the few platforms in which Navy can deliver its message to the people of Australia. The current director of music is Commander Cassandra Mohapp.

History 
In 1893, the New South Wales Naval Brigade Band comprised 22 personnel. Another of the very early naval bands was the Band of the Victorian Naval Brigade which was present (as a band of the Commonwealth Naval Force in 1901) at the arrival of the US Navy's "Great White Fleet" into Port Phillip Bay in 1908.

On 10 July 1911, King George V gave the Commonwealth Naval Forces the name of Royal Australian Navy.

On 21 June 1913, six musicians (recruited in Melbourne) were sent to the United Kingdom to join up with a number of ex-bandsmen from the British Navy to form the Royal Australian Navy Band. The members of the band returned to Sydney on 4 October 1913.

During WWII, the Korean War and the Vietnam War, musicians of the band performed at concerts for Australian troops.

Composition

Detachments 
The different detachments of the band include:

 RAN Band Melbourne (full-time)
 RAN Band Queensland (part-time)
 RAN Band South Australia
 RAN Band Sydney (full-time)
 RAN Band Tasmania (part-time)
 RAN Band Western Australia (part-time)

Ceremonial Drums 
The Ceremonial Drums of the RAN Band were commissioned by the Government of Australia on July 10, 1961 to mark the 50th anniversary of the band's naming. The set consists of eight side drums, two tenor drums and one bass drum.

Repertoire 
The repertoire of the RAN Band includes but is not limited to:

 Serving in Harmony
 Duke of York
 On The Quarterdeck
 March of the Royal Australian Navy
 Scipio
 The Middy
 Scrap Iron Flotilla
 Warship
 Waltzing Matilda
 Abide With Me
 Amazing Grace
 Crimond
 Deep Harmony
 Eternal Father
 O God Our Help
 Advance Australia Fair
 God Save The King

See also
The Lancer Band
Australian Army Band Corps
Royal Australian Air Force Band

References

External links

Official Website
 Official Facebook page
 Official Youtube Channel

Military units and formations established in 1968
Royal Australian Navy
Australian military bands
Musical groups established in 1968
1968 establishments in Australia